Francisco Javier Prieto Alvarez (born 5 July 1987) is a Mexican professional boxer who challenged for the WBC lightweight title in 2014 and held the WBC Silver lightweight title from 2013 to 2014.

Professional career 
Prieto made his professional debut as a boxer at the age of eighteen, defeating his opponent by way of technical knockout on March 16, 2006.

Prieto has twice fought to a draw against Ivan Cano.

Professional boxing record

References

External links

1987 births
Living people
Mexican male boxers
Boxers from Michoacán
People from Apatzingán
Lightweight boxers